San Salvatore di Fitalia (Sicilian: Santu Sarvaturi di Fitalia) is a comune (municipality) in the Province of Messina in the Italian region of Sicily, located about  east of Palermo and about  west of Messina.

San Salvatore di Fitalia borders the following municipalities: Castell'Umberto, Frazzanò, Galati Mamertino, Mirto, Naso, Tortorici.

References

Cities and towns in Sicily